Help Me may refer to: 
Mayday (distress signal), the English pronunciation of the French phrase "" ("Come help me")
"Help Me" (House), the sixth-season finale of House

Songs
 "Help Me" (Sonny Boy Williamson II song), a 1963 blues standard first recorded by Sonny Boy Williamson II
 "Help Me" (Larry Gatlin song), a song covered by Kris Kristofferson in 1972 and Elvis Presley in 1974
 "Help Me" (Joni Mitchell song), a 1974 song from the album Court and Spark
 "Help Me" (Nick Carter song), a 2002 single from the album Now or Never
 "Help Me" (Alkaline Trio song), a 2008 single from the album Agony and Irony
 "Help Me" (Tinchy Stryder song), a 2012 single from the album Full Tank
 "Help Me", a song by Chris Brown from his 2007 album Exclusive
 "Help Me", a song by Demi Lovato featuring Dead Sara from the album Holy Fvck
 "Help Me", a song by Deuce from the album Nine Lives
 "Help Me", a song by E-40 from his 2012 album The Block Brochure: Welcome to the Soil 1
 "Help Me!" (Marcy Levy and Robin Gibb song), a 1980 song from Times Square: The Original Motion Picture Soundtrack
 "Help Me!!" (Morning Musume song), a 2013 single

See also
 Help (disambiguation)
 "Help Me, Rhonda", a 1965 single by The Beach Boys
 "Hilf mir" (German for "Help me"), a 2005 song by Rammstein